Lambert of Hersfeld (also called Lampert;  – 1082/85) was a medieval chronicler. His work represents a major source for the history of the German kingdom of Henry IV and the incipient Investiture Controversy in the eleventh century.

Life

What little is known of his life is revealed in scattered details from his own historical writings. Probably a Franconian by birth, of good family, he prepared for an ecclesiastical career at the cathedral school in Bamberg, where he received tuition by Anno of Steusslingen, the later Archbishop of Cologne. On 15 March 1058 Lambert entered the Benedictine abbey of Hersfeld as a monk. On September 16, he was also ordained as a priest in Aschaffenburg and therefore sometimes called Lampert of Aschaffenburg.

After his elevation to the priesthood, he made a pilgrimage to Jerusalem. Back in Hersfeld in October 1059, Lambert worked in the cloister library and taught at the monastery school. In 1071 he visited the Benedictine abbeys of Siegburg and Saalfeld to study the Cluniac Reforms, promoted by his mentor Archbishop Anno II of Cologne. However, Lambert adhered to traditional Benedictine rules and remained reserved towards monastic reforms.

Lambert was a convinced opponent of the German king Henry IV. In 1077, during the rising conflict with Pope Gregory VII, he moved from Hersfeld to the canon monastery of Hasungen at the instigation of Henry's enemy Archbishop Siegfried I of Mainz. He turned Hasungen into a Benedictine abbey, settled with monks descending from Hirsau. A variety of circumstantial evidence suggests that from 1081, Lambert even served as the first abbot.

He probably died shortly afterwards, no later than in 1085.

Historical works
Lambert is most famous as the author of an extensive historical chronicle known as the Annales, first published in 1525 by Kaspar Currer in Tübingen. They were edited in the Monumenta Germaniae Historica, along with Lampert's other known works, by Oswald Holder-Egger (MGH Scriptores rerum Germanicarum in usu scholarum, vol. 38) in 1894. Holder-Egger, in his edition of Lampert's work, also demonstrated that Lampert was the likely author of at least two other significant works: the  Vita Lulli archiepiscopi Mogontiacensis, a hagiography of the founder of Hersfeld Abbey, Saint Lullus, Archbishop of Mainz (c. 710–786), and a shorter, polemic history of the Hersfeld monastery (Libellus de institutione Herveldensis ecclesiae), which survives only fragmentarily in excerpts made by later medieval German writers. Lambert's history of the Germans, De rebus gestis Germanorum was printed in the compilation of chronicles edited by Johann Pistorius (Frankfurt, 1613).

The Annals begin with a universal history from the creation of the world until about 1040. This portion of the work is drawn largely from other, earlier annalistic works, particularly those of Saint Bede, Isidore of Seville, and from German traditions like the Annals of Quedlinburg and Weissenburg. From about the date of 1042 onwards, however, the account is Lampert's own and he carries the history from there up to the year 1077, when the Swabian duke Rudolf of Rheinfelden was crowned anti-king by the dissident princes. Lambert's Annales are among the most important sources available for the reign of King Henry IV, the Investiture Controversy, and the Saxon Rebellion in 1073–75. Among the significant events detailed in Lampert's history are the infamous Coup of Kaiserswerth in 1062, Henry's famous Walk to Canossa where he submitted (albeit temporarily) to Pope Gregory VII, and the 1075 Battle of Langensalza where Henry's forces defeated the Saxon and Thuringian rebels. Lambert ended his work with the election of anti-king Rudolf of Swabia, stating that his own account had reached an appropriate conclusion and that another writer would be able to pick up from where he left off in chronicling this new era for the German kingdom (Rudolf was mortally wounded in the Battle on the Elster against Henry's forces in 1080).

Lampert was superbly educated for his day and wrote in a fine, classicizing Latin peppered with references and allusions to Roman authors, particularly Livy, Sallust, and the playwright Terence. Like many of the classical authors he admired, Lampert fancied himself a cynical observer of elite society, casting a critical eye on the political melodramas and scandals of his day and chronicling the way in which power and pride corrupted rulers and perverted society, raising up the unworthy and punishing the good and decent.

Lampert's chronicle was translated into English by I.S. Robsinson in 2015 as The Annals of Lampert of Hersfeld.

Reputation as a historian

Throughout, Lambert demonstrates his hostility to 'godless' King Henry IV and royal interests, which is not surprising given his sympathies for the independence of the regional aristocracy. He expresses a generally favorable opinion of Pope Gregory VII and the ecclesiastical reform movement, but also evinces skepticism towards some contemporary monastic reforms in Germany. He is also quite uncharitable towards figures like Archbishop Siegfried I of Mainz, who encroached on the traditional rights and prerogatives of Hersfeld and other monasteries.

Lambert's assessments, especially of Henry's Walk to Canossa, dominated the German historical image up to the times of the Kulturkampf in the nineteenth century. On the other hand, German historians trained in the positivistic methods of comparative source criticism taught that Lampert was a strongly biased, partisan writer who could not be trusted for an objective account of the reign of Henry IV. Oswald Holder-Egger himself called Lambert an outright fabulist in some instances. Scholars at this time held critical objectivity to be the highest value in a historical source and Lambert, along with many other medieval writers, failed to meet this standard. While they acknowledged Lambert provided important details for certain events and dates, his own view of history and opinions about some matters could not be accepted.

Today, however, historians try to approach medieval historiography on its own terms and in its own contexts, rather than impose modern standards of objectivity on medieval authors. Modern scholars recognize Lambert as an important voice representing the conservative views of the regional aristocracy and elite monasticism in a turbulent period in the kingdom's history.

Notes

External links
Lambert of Hersfeld at the Catholic Encyclopedia
 (with up-to-date references and bibliography)
Extracts from the Annals of Lambert of Hersfeld

References
Hans Delbrück, Uber die Glaubwurdigkeit Lamberts von Hersfeld (Bonn, 1873)
August Eigenbrodt, Lampert von Hersfeld und die neuere Quellenforschung (Cassel, 1896)
Leopold von Ranke, Zür Kritik frankisch-deutscher Reichsannalisten (Berlin, 1854)
I.S. Robinson (trans.), The Annals of Lampert of Hersfeld (Manchester, 2015)
Wolfgang Stammler (ed.), "Lampert von Hersfeld, in:  Die deutsche Literatur des Mittelalters. Verfasserlexikon vol. 5 (Berlin/New York 1985), cols. 514–520
Edmund E. Stengel, "Lampert von Hersfeld. Der erste Abt von Hasungen," in Aus Verfassungs- und Landesgeschichte, Festschrift für Theodor Mayer, vol. 2 (1955), pp. 245–258.
Tilman Struve, "Lampert von Hersfeld. Persönlichkeit und Weltbild eines Geschichtsschreibers am Beginn des Investiturstreits," in: Hessisches Jahrbuch für Landesgeschichte 19 (1969), pp. 1–123 and 20 (1970), pp. 32–142
Wilhelm Wattenbach, Deutschlands Geschichtsquellen Band ii. (Berlin, 1906)

1088 deaths
11th-century German historians
Medieval Latin historical texts
German chroniclers
Year of birth uncertain
1020s births
German male non-fiction writers
11th-century Latin writers
11th-century German writers